Jen Simmons is a graphic designer, web developer, educator and speaker known for her expertise in web standards, particularly HTML and CSS. She is a member of the CSS Working Group and has been prominent in the deployment of CSS grid layout. She worked as a developer advocate at Mozilla and later at Apple.

Life 
Simmons earned a BA in sociology from Gordon College in 1991. In 2007 she graduated from Temple University with an MFA in Film and Media Arts. In addition to working on websites since 1998, Simmons is a designer for print pieces and live performance, including projection and lighting design work.

She is a creator of Bartik theme for Drupal, which became one of core themes and a default in Drupal versions 7, 8 and 9.

In 2013 she joined the Responsive Images Community Group one of groups of the World Wide Web Consortium (W3C).

She was a designer and developer advocate at Mozilla since 2016, where she designed the Firefox browser's Grid Inspector. Since 2020 Simmons is a developer advocate at Apple for the Web Developer Experience team for WebKit and Safari. 

Simmons is a member of the CSS Working Group created by the W3C since 2016. She joined CCS WG when working for Mozilla and continued as an Apple employee. She helped prepare and communicate CSS grid layout specification (level 1 and 2), CSS Containment Module Level 3, CSS Cascading and Inheritance (level 5 and 6), CSS Shapes Module Level 1. She was an editor on CSS Box Sizing Module level 4 and on CSS Grid Layout Level 3.

Significance 
Simmons run the YouTube channel "Layout Land" and coined the term "intrinsic design" to refer to her philosophy of web layouts that mix fixed, content-sized, and fluid layout. She is a frequent conference speaker at events such as An Event Apart, South by Southwest, Fluent, DrupalCon, and SmashingConf.

Simmons has been on Twitter since 2007 and has over 50 thousand followers. In 2007, she coined the term "fail whale" for the website's error message illustration that showed during outages until 2013.

References

External links

Year of birth missing (living people)
Living people
Web developers
Temple University alumni
Gordon College (Massachusetts) alumni
American graphic designers
Place of birth missing (living people)